Ally Love is an American fitness instructor who is a popular instructor for Peloton, the CEO/Founder of Love Squad, the in-arena Host of the Brooklyn Nets, an Adidas Global Ambassador, and a model.

Early life and career 
Ally Love was raised in Miami, Florida. When she was young, she was hit by a car and told she would likely never walk normally again, but she ultimately made a full recovery.

Love graduated from New World School of the Arts high school in Miami, where she specialized in dance. She went on to attend Fordham University's partner program with the Alvin Ailey School for dance. She earned a Bachelor of Fine Arts from Fordham, where she majored in dance and minored in theology.

Career

Dance and modeling career 
Love has performed as a dancer for the New York Knicks and toured with contemporary ballet companies in North America, and is signed with the modeling agency Women360 management / Supreme. She has modeled in ads for Victoria's Secret, Reebok, Self Magazine, Women's Health magazine, Macy's, Kohl's, Fitness magazine, Health magazine, Doritos, and Under Armour.

Health and fitness 
Love has been the in-arena host of the Brooklyn Nets at Barclays Center since 2012. In this role, she interviews players, fans, and coaches throughout the game and is featured on the stadium jumbotron.

Love has been a Peloton instructor since early 2017. Peloton scouts were interested in Love after seeing her work for the Nets and Adidas. Her Peloton instructor audition lasted only 15 minutes before she was hired for the role.

Love is the founder and CEO of Love Squad, a fitness and lifestyle website meant to empower women in business, fitness, and life. The site focuses on sports, entertainment, beauty, and fitness and has also expanded into live events in New York City, including panel events and group workouts.

Love is a global ambassador for Adidas.

Love is also a Certified Health Coach from the Institute of Integrative Nutrition and NASM certified trainer.

Personal life 
Love resides in Manhattan, where she is a big fan of standup comedy. She married Andrew Haynes in August 2021. Haynes proposed to Ally Love on Christmas Eve on a tropical vacation to Mexico’s Riviera Maya.

References 

Year of birth missing (living people)
Living people
American dancers
American female dancers
African-American female dancers
African-American sportswomen
Brooklyn Nets personnel
Dancers from Florida
Fordham University alumni
Sportspeople from Miami
Peloton instructors
21st-century African-American people
21st-century African-American women